Arif Dashdemirov (born 10 February 1987) is an Azerbaijani football defender who last played for Sumgayit FK in the Azerbaijan Premier League.

Career
Dashdemirov signed a one-year contract with Gabala in August 2009. Dashdemirov re-signed for Gabala in June 2015. On 25 May 2016, Gabala announced that Dashdemirov had left the club. Following the 2015–16 Cup Final, Qarabağ FK manager Gurban Gurbanov announced that the club had signed Dashdemirov.

On 6 August 2018, Dashdemirov signed for Sumgayit FK.

Career statistics

Club

International

Statistics accurate as of match played 17 November 2015

Honours

Qarabağ FK
Azerbaijan Premier League: (1) 2016–17

References

External links
 
 

1987 births
Living people
Association football defenders
Azerbaijani footballers
Azerbaijan under-21 international footballers
Azerbaijan international footballers
AZAL PFK players
Gabala FC players
Shamakhi FK players
FK MKT Araz players
Qarabağ FK players
Azerbaijan Premier League players